The Ponghak Line is a non-electrified standard-gauge freight-only branch line of the Korean State Railway in P'yŏngsŏng city, South P'yŏngan Province, North Korea, running from Ponghak on the P'yŏngra Line to serve a number of industries around Songudong east of Ponghak Station.

Route
A yellow background in the "Distance" box indicates that section of the line is not electrified.

References

Railway lines in North Korea
Standard gauge railways in North Korea